The 1968 UC San Diego Tritons football team was an American football team that represented the University of California, San Diego as an independent during the 1968 NCAA College Division football season. In their only year under head coach Walt Hackett, the team compiled an 0–7 record. This represented the lone season of Tritons football as the program was officially discontinued prior to the 1969 season.

Their 34–31 loss against the California Institute of Technology at Pasadena, ended a 34-game losing streak for the  that stretched back to their 1964 season.

Schedule

References

UC San Diego
UC San Diego Tritons football seasons
College football winless seasons
UC San Diego Tritons football